Flint Township may refer to:

 Flint Township, Pike County, Illinois
 Flint Township, Michigan
 Flint Township, Stutsman County, North Dakota, in Stutsman County, North Dakota

Township name disambiguation pages